Greg Seitz is the current director of athletics for Jacksonville State University. Seitz graduated from the University of North Alabama in 1993, and served in numerous roles in the Jacksonville State athletic department from 1993 to 2015. After serving as interim athletic director following the retirement of Warren Koegel on December 31, 2014, Seitz was named Jacksonville State's athletic director on a permanent basis on February 26, 2016.

References

External links
 
Jacksonville State Gamecocks bio

Living people
Jacksonville State Gamecocks athletic directors
Year of birth missing (living people)